Step On Out is the 10th country studio album (12th total) from American country music quartet The Oak Ridge Boys, released in 1985. It contains the #1 singles "Touch a Hand (Make a Friend)" and "Little Things", as well as the #3 single "Come On In (You Did the Best You Could Do)".  The title song was co-written by Rock & Roll Hall of Fame member and former Byrds bass player Chris Hillman and former Crawdaddy magazine editor Peter Knobler. "Staying Afloat" would be covered two years later by Sawyer Brown on their self-titled debut album.

Critical reception
A review in Billboard praised "Ophelia" and "Little Things" as the most interesting songs, while also making note of Chancey's production and the vocal harmonies.

Track listing

Singles
Little Things / Secret Of Love - 1985 - MCA 52556
Come On In (You Did The Best You Could Do) / Roll Tennessee River - 1985 - MCA 52646 
Touch A Hand Make A Friend / Only One I Love - 1985 - MCA 57272

Personnel

The Oak Ridge Boys
Duane Allen - baritone vocals
Joe Bonsall - tenor vocals
William Lee Golden - baritone vocals
Richard Sterban - bass vocals

Additional musicians
Barry Beckett - keyboards
Mickey Buckins - percussion
Harrison Calloway - horns
Duncan Cameron - electric guitar, acoustic guitar
Jimmy Capps - acoustic guitar
Jerry Carrigan - drums
Ronnie Eades - horns
Lloyd Green - steel guitar
Roger Hawkins - drums
David Hood - bass guitar
Jim Horn - horns
Clayton Ivey - keyboards
Jimmy Johnson - electric guitar
Kenneth Lovelace - fiddle
Nashville String Machine - string section
Steve Nathan - keyboards
Ron Oates - keyboards
Wayne Perkins - electric guitar
Charles Rose - horns
Brent Rowan - electric guitar
Billy Sanford - electric guitar, acoustic guitar
Dennis Solee - horns
Harvey Thompson - horns
Jack Williams - bass guitar
Reggie Young - electric guitar

Charts

Weekly charts

Year-end charts

References

1985 albums
MCA Records albums
The Oak Ridge Boys albums
Albums produced by Ron Chancey
Albums recorded at Muscle Shoals Sound Studio